Diana Navarro Ocaña (born 21 April 1978 in Málaga) is a Spanish singer. She rose to fame in 2005 with the single "Sola" from her first album No te olvides de mí. She was nominated for a Latin Grammy as Best New Artist in 2005. Her songs usually mix genres like copla and flamenco with different rhythms like Arabic or classical music.

Discography
No te olvides de mí (2005)
24 rosas (2007)			
Camino verde (2008)
Flamenco (2011)
Género chica (2012)	 
La esencia (2013, compilation album)
Resiliencia (2016)
Inesperado (2019)

References

1977 births
Living people
21st-century Spanish singers
21st-century Spanish women singers
Women in Latin music